Álvaro Bastida Moya (born 12 May 2004) is a Spanish footballer who plays as a midfielder for Cádiz CF B.

Club career
Born in Chiclana de la Frontera, Cádiz, Andalusia, Bastida joined Cádiz CF's youth setup at early age, from APA Sancti Petri. On 25 April 2021, aged just 16, he made his senior debut with the reserves by coming on as a second-half substitute in a 2–1 Segunda División B away win over Sevilla Atlético.

Bastida made his first team – and La Liga – debut on 21 May 2021, replacing Jens Jønsson in a 2–2 away draw against Levante UD; aged 17 years and nine days, he became the youngest player to feature in the top tier for the club.

International career
On 24 August 2021, Bastida was called up to the Spain under-18 team for a friendly tournament in France.

References

External links
 
 
 

2004 births
Living people
People from Chiclana de la Frontera
Sportspeople from the Province of Cádiz
Spanish footballers
Footballers from Andalusia
Association football midfielders
La Liga players
Segunda División B players
Segunda Federación players
Cádiz CF B players
Cádiz CF players
Spain youth international footballers